The Astana Open is a professional tennis tournament, held in Astana, Kazakhstan, at the end of October each year since 2020. The tournament is held on indoor hard courts. In 2020, it was primarily organised due to the cancellation of many tournaments during the 2020 season, because of the ongoing COVID-19 pandemic. From 2021, the tournament is carried out as a combined event, with a women's tournament being played the week after the men's (as part of the WTA Tour). It is the first time in history that an ATP and a WTA tournament has been held in Kazakhstan.

Past finals

Men's singles

Women's singles

Men's doubles

Women's doubles

References

External links
 WTA - official page
 ATP - official page

Tennis tournaments by country
Tennis tournaments in Asia by country
Tennis in Kazakhstan
Sports competitions in Kazakhstan
ATP Tour
WTA Tour
Recurring sporting events established in 2020